Kristin R. Graziano is the first female sheriff and first openly gay sheriff to be elected in the state of South Carolina. She defeated her opponent, Al Cannon, in the November 2020 election.

Career

Charleston County Sheriff 
Graziano informally announced her desire to run for sheriff of Charleston, against the sheriff incumbent, Al Cannon, in February 2020. In response to the announcement, Cannon, in a criticized and controversial move, decided to place her on unpaid administrative until after the election was over. On November 4, 2020, it was announced Graziano won the election against Cannon, who'd served as the county's sheriff since 1988, with 52% of the votes. Graziano has said she plans to ban chokeholds and no-knock warrants, the latter being especially of public interest as just months before the election, the fatal shooting of Breonna Taylor occurred as the result of a no-knock warrant being executed.

Personal life 
Graziano is openly gay.

References 

South Carolina sheriffs
Lesbian politicians
Year of birth missing (living people)
Living people